Meung is a district (muang) of Bokeo province in northwestern Laos.

References

Districts of Bokeo province